The Oude Rijn (Old Rhine) is a branch of the Rhine delta in the Dutch provinces of Utrecht and South Holland, starting west of Utrecht, at Harmelen and runs by a mechanical pumping station into the North Sea at Katwijk. Its present-day length is 52 kilometres.

In ancient times, the river was the lower part of the main Rhine branch, forking at Batavia Island, now Betuwe, in a northern branche, Rhine and southern branche Maas. It was much broader and was influenced by sea-tides. During occupation of the Romans the river formed part of the northern border of the Roman Empire. In medieval times, river Lek became the main draining river for Rhinewater and the Old Rhine was silting. The river still was important as draining river for the surrounding lowlands, for clay-industry and as a transport and trade route. Ships were towed by horse- and humanpower, using a towpath along large sections of the river, many parts of which have been upgraded to (cycling-)roads over time.

Description
The city of Utrecht was founded at a ford near the fork of river Kromme Rijn into the Vecht to the north, and the Oude Rijn to the west. Of the original fork, little remains today and both Vecht and Rijn start from the city moat. For the first few kilometres of its course, the river is channelised and known as Leidse Rijn (Leiden Rhine). It becomes the Oude Rijn after the railway bridge near Harmelen (municipality Woerden). Then it flows westward through Woerden where first the river Lange Linschoten branches off to the south and then the Oude Rijn forms part of the city moats.

After Woerden, the river Grecht branches off to the north and the Oude Rijn continues through the towns of Nieuwerbrug, Bodegraven, and Zwammerdam. Here the river De Meije ends into the Oude Rijn. In Alphen aan den Rijn, river Gouwe branches off to the south and the Aar Canal ends in the Old Rhine. It flows then along Koudekerk aan den Rijn and Hazerswoude-Rijndijk (both part of the municipality of Rijnwoude).

After Zoeterwoude-Rijndijk and Leiderdorp, where the short river Does ends, the Oude Rijn flows through Leiden. Here starts the Rhine-Schie Canal (to the south) and the stream Zijl (to the north). The Nieuwe Rijn (New Rhine) is a short branch that together with the Oude Rijn are part of Leiden's moat system and both branches merge in the city's centre.

The stream Korte Vliet discharges into the Oude Rijn and it continues through Valkenburg and Rijnsburg to Katwijk. At Katwijk aan den Rijn the Oegstgeesterkanaal merges with the Oude Rijn. From here the river has been straightened into a canal (called Uitwateringkanaal) and ends into the North Sea through a pumping station, preventing high tides inland and silting up of the river mouth.

Water management & Waterworks

Around 1000 CE the river silted up, causing floodings of the lowlands. As prevention, around 1100 CE a dam with locks was built at the village of Zwammerdam, upstream at the border to Utrecht, an area reigned by German Emperor Frederick Barbarossa. Continuing problems in water management in wide areas along Oude Rijn were reason for civilians with administrative responsibilities to collaborate and to establish a so-called High Water Authority or in Dutch Hoogheemraadschap, the first of its kind in The Netherlands. The organisation has been privileged in 1255 by Count William II of Holland and Zeeland as central coordinator of all waterworks in the area and later was given the name Hoogheemraadschap van Rijnland. Early works were the building of draining canals around the city of Leiden. From 1408 on, with the first at Zoeterwoude, wind-powered pumps were installed along the Old Rhine, to pump water from the lowlands into the river.

The river silted up in the course of the Middle Ages and became much smaller. In 1572 near the North Sea the Water Authority had a canal built through the dunes to allow the Rhine water to flow into the sea, but due to war circumstances, it did silt. In 1807, a large water management system with locks was established to allow the water to flow out at low tide. In 1880 a steam driven mechanical pumping station was built.

History

Roman era
In Roman times, the river Oude Rijn formed part of the Roman Empire's northern border (Limes Germanicus). At strategic locations the Romans did build guarding-towers and border-guarding castella and castra, including: Laurum (Woerden), Nigrum Pullum (Zwammerdam), Albaniana (Alphen aan den Rijn), Matilo (Leiderdorp), Praetorium Agrippinae (Valkenburg), and Lugdunum Batavorum (Katwijk). Many of the at that time unpopulated locations, evolved into cities and villages.

In Valkenburg, the layout of the Roman castellum has been marked in the pavement. At Woerden and Zwammerdam, Roman ships have been excavated.

Visuals

Notes

References
Martin Hendriksma, "De Rijn. Biografie van een rivier", Publisher De Geus, 2017

External links

Rivers of the Rhine–Meuse–Scheldt delta
Rivers of South Holland
Rivers of Utrecht (province)
Rivers of the Netherlands